The Lent Bumps 2003 were a series of rowing races held at Cambridge University from Tuesday 25 February 2003 until Saturday 1 March 2003. The event was run as a bumps race and has been held annually in late-February or early March since 1887. See Lent Bumps for the format of the races. In 2003, a total of 121 crews took part (69 men's crews and 52 women's crews), with nearly 1100 participants.

Head of the River crews 
 Caius men rowed-over in 1st position, retaining the headship.

 Caius women bumped Lady Margaret, Jesus and Emmanuel to take their first ever women's headship of the Lent Bumps.

Caius also held both the double headship in the May Bumps 2002, meaning that all four headships were held by the same club simultaneously – the first time this has ever happened in bumps history.

Highest 2nd VIIIs 
 The highest men's 2nd VIII for the 4th consecutive year was Caius II.

 The highest women's 2nd VIII for the 3rd consecutive year was Jesus II.

Links to races in other years

Bumps Charts 
Below are the bumps charts for the 1st and 2nd divisions, with the men's event on the left and women's event on the right. The bumps chart represents the progress of every crew over all four days of the racing. To follow the progress of any particular crew, simply find the crew's name on the left side of the chart and follow the line to the end-of-the-week finishing position on the right of the chart.

References 
 CUCBC – the organisation that runs the bumps
 First and Third Trinity Boat Club
 Cambridge University Radio (CUR1350) downloadable MP3s of race commentary

Lent Bumps results
2003 in rowing
2003 in English sport